Augusto Vilela Gama (born 26 January 1970) is a Portuguese football manager and former player who played as a forward. He is the current assistant manager of Rio Ave FC.

He amassed Primeira Liga totals of 206 matches and 14 goals over 11 seasons, in representation of Braga and Rio Ave. He added 229 appearances and goals 41 in the Segunda Liga, in a career mainly associated with the latter club.

Club career
Born in the village of Lanhas, Vila Verde, Braga District, Gama started his career at S.C. Braga, but only totalled four Primeira Liga appearances in his first two seasons, his debut in the competition coming on 24 October 1987 by playing eight minutes in a 2–2 home draw against Vitória de Setúbal. After a loan to AD Fafe in the second division his fate did not improve, and he left in June 1992.

Gama subsequently signed for Rio Ave F.C. also in the second level, going on to remain with the club until his retirement 15 years later and compete in a further seven top-flight campaigns. In 1997–98 he scored four goals in 34 games, helping the Vila do Conde-based team to the ninth position.

Gama continued to work with Rio Ave after retiring at the age of 37, acting as assistant coach to several coaches. On 22 December 2018, after José Gomes left to sign with Reading of the English Championship, he was named interim manager.

International career
Gama received a call-up to the Portugal under-18 side in 1987, being included in José Augusto's squad for five matches and making his debut in a 1–2 loss against the Netherlands on 17 April, as a substitute. In 1990 he was picked for the under-21s, earning the first of his seven caps on 21 May against England, a 1–0 win.

Personal life
Gama's younger brother, Bruno, was also a footballer. He too represented Braga and Rio Ave.

Honours
Rio Ave
Segunda Liga: 1995–96, 2002–03

References

External links

1970 births
Living people
People from Vila Verde
Portuguese footballers
Association football forwards
Primeira Liga players
Liga Portugal 2 players
Segunda Divisão players
S.C. Braga players
AD Fafe players
S.C. Braga B players
Rio Ave F.C. players
Portugal youth international footballers
Portugal under-21 international footballers
Portuguese football managers
Primeira Liga managers
Rio Ave F.C. managers
Sportspeople from Braga District